Kuure Festival is an annual festival celebrated by the chiefs and people of Zaare in the Upper East Region of Ghana who are mostly blacksmiths. It is usually celebrated in the months of January and February.

Celebrations 
During the festival, there are sacrifices made and then followed by dancing and drumming.

Significance 
The festival is celebrated to symbolize the 'Kuure' which means hoe in the Gurune language. The hoe is the main tool for farming in their community and that means it is their livelihood.

References 

Festivals in Ghana
Upper East Region